Northern Ireland is divided into 11 districts for local government purposes.  In Northern Ireland, local councils do not carry out the same range of functions as those in the rest of the United Kingdom; for example they have no responsibility for education, road-building or housing (although they do nominate members to the advisory Northern Ireland Housing Council). Their functions include planning, waste and recycling services, leisure and community services, building control and local economic and cultural development.  The collection of rates is handled centrally by the Land and Property Services agency of the Northern Ireland Executive.

Local Government Districts 

The 11 districts were established in 2015. Basic geographical statistics are shown below; data collected for 'religion or religion brought up in' and 'national identity' by district are listed separately.

Previously (between 1972 and 2015) the country was divided into 26 smaller districts.

Composition of District Councils
Based on the 2019 Northern Ireland local elections.

Last updated 14 February 2023

History 
The current pattern of 11 local government districts was established on 1 April 2015, as a result of the reform process that started in 2005.

The previous pattern of local government in Northern Ireland, with 26 councils, was established in 1973 by the Local Government (Boundaries) Act (Northern Ireland) 1971 and the Local Government Act (Northern Ireland) 1972 to replace the previous system established by the Local Government (Ireland) Act 1898. The system was based on the recommendations of the Macrory Report, of June 1970, which presupposed the continued existence of the Government of Northern Ireland to act as a regional-level authority.

From 1921 to 1973, Northern Ireland was divided into six administrative counties (subdivided into urban and rural districts) and two county boroughs. The counties and county boroughs continue to exist for the purposes of lieutenancy and shrievalty. This system, with the abolition of rural districts, remains the model for local government in the Republic of Ireland. (See also List of rural and urban districts in Northern Ireland for more details)

Elections
Councillors are elected for a four-year term of office under the single transferable vote (STV) system. Elections were last held on 2 May 2019 and are next scheduled to be held on 4 May 2023. To qualify for election, a councillor candidate must be:
 at least 18 years of age, and
 a Commonwealth of Nations or European Union citizen
In addition, they must either:
 be a local elector for the district, or
 have, during the whole of the 12-month period prior to the election, either owned or occupied land in the district, or else resided or worked in the district

Combinations 
The districts are combined for various purposes.

Eurostat NUTS level 3 
In the Eurostat Nomenclature of Territorial Units for Statistics (NUTS), Northern Ireland is divided into five parts at level 3

Former Education and Library Boards 
There were five education and library boards (ELBs) in Northern Ireland.

As part of the Review of Public Administration process, the library functions of the ELBs were taken over by a new body, the Northern Ireland Library Authority (branded Libraries NI) in April 2009.

The education and skills functions were centralised into a single Education Authority for Northern Ireland in April 2015.

The boards were as follows:

Former Health and Social Services Boards 
There were four health and social services boards which were replaced by a single Health and Social Care Board in April 2009.

The former health and social services boards were as follows:

Reform 

In June 2002, the Northern Ireland Executive established a Review of Public Administration to review the arrangements for the accountability, development, administration and delivery of public services. Among its recommendations were a reduction in the number of districts. In 2005 Peter Hain, the Secretary of State for Northern Ireland, announced proposals to reduce the number of councils to seven. The names and boundaries of the seven districts were announced in March 2007. In March 2008 the restored Northern Executive agreed to create eleven new councils instead of the original seven. The first elections were due to take place in May 2011. However, by May 2010 disagreements among parties in the executive over district boundaries were expected to delay the reforms until 2015. In June 2010 the proposed reforms were abandoned following the failure of the Northern Ireland Executive to reach agreement. However, on 12 March 2012, the Northern Ireland Executive published its programme for government, which included a commitment to reduce the number of councils in Northern Ireland to 11.

See also 
 List of districts in Northern Ireland by area
 List of districts in Northern Ireland by population density
 List of districts in Northern Ireland by religion or religion brought up in
 List of districts in Northern Ireland by national identity
 Political make-up of local councils in Northern Ireland
 Local government in England
 Local government in Scotland
 Local government in Wales
 Local government in the Republic of Ireland

Tables relating to the old 26 council system
 List of districts in Northern Ireland by national identity
 List of districts in Northern Ireland by population

Notes

References

External links
Local councils in Northern Ireland NI Direct (Archived)
NI Local Government Association
Review of Public Administration NI
Local Government Boundaries Commissioner for Northern Ireland (Archived)
Local Government DOE NI (Archived)
Macrory Report CAIN Web Service (University of Ulster)
Local Government (Boundaries) Act (Northern Ireland) 1971 CAIN Web Service (University of Ulster)
Northern Ireland Councillor's Handbook Local Government Staff Commission for Northern Ireland (Archived)
Map of all UK local authorities Office for National Statistics, 2009